Earl LeRoy Burbridge (May 30, 1906 – April 7, 1962) was an American college football player and coach. He served as the head football coach at Stout Institute, now known as the University of Wisconsin–Stout, from 1930 to 1934, compiling a record of 6–26–1. He graduated from the Washington University School of Medicine in 1939 and went into the pharmaceutical industry.

References

1906 births
1962 deaths
Wisconsin Badgers football players
Wisconsin–Stout Blue Devils baseball coaches
Wisconsin–Stout Blue Devils football coaches
Wisconsin–Stout Blue Devils men's basketball coaches
Sportspeople from Chicago
Players of American football from Chicago